Aan Dhevathai is a 2018 Indian Tamil-language family drama film written and directed by Jayachitra. The film stars Samuthirakani, Ramya Pandian, Kavin, and Monica, while Radha Ravi, Ilavarasu, Kaali Venkat, Abhishek Vinod, Hareesh Peradi, and Suja Varunee  play pivotal and supporting roles. The film has music composed by Ghibran, cinematography by Vijay Milton, and editing by Kasi Viswanathan. The venture began production in September 2017 and released on 12 October 2018 to average reviews from critics.

Plot
Elango (Samuthirakani) falls in love with Jessy (Ramya Pandian), and both get married. Elango is employed as a medical sales representative, and both of them have no parents/relatives. Jessy secures a software job and life runs smoothly. They are gifted with twins – Agaran (Kavin) and Aathira (Monica). Jessy is more career-oriented, aspiring to achieve greater heights. Elango, on the other hand, thinks family is the at-most preference and feels that they are unable to spend quality time with their children. As Jessy earns more than Elango, the latter decides to quit his job and stay at home taking care of their children and household activities. Jessy is against this decision as she dreams of leading a luxurious life if both could earn.

Jessy is impressed seeing her colleague Belita (Suja Varunee), who leads a lavish lifestyle owning a villa and a BMW car. Much against Elango's advice, Jessy books an apartment which is under construction. She also buys a BMW car despite Elango warning her about the problems associated with increased bank loans and EMI. Roy (Abhishek Vinod) is Jessy's boss who has an eye on her. Arguments arise frequently between Elango and Jessy, which leads to Elango leaving the house as Jessy keeps insulting him for being a stay-at-home father. Aathira also goes out with Elango, while Agaran stays with Jessy. Elango finds shelter with the help of Bullet Thatha (Radha Ravi), a kindhearted man who meets Agaran once in a while. Elango also secures a job as a waiter in a restaurant. Seeing Elango's cooking skills, the restaurant owner promotes him as a chef.

To Jessy's shock, Belita commits suicide as she felt humiliated by a few goons who were employed by the bank to recover her unpaid loans. Jessy realizes the problems associated with too much bank loans. Roy tries to enter into a physical relationship with Jessy for which she does not cooperate, leading him to fire her from job as a means of revenge. Jessy is devastated as she has lost her job and could not pay her EMIs. Jessy misses her EMI payments and goons arrive at Jessy's home to recover loans. Knowing this, Elango arrives and requests the goons to give him some time, so that they can repay the loans. Elango settles some money with the help of his restaurant owner. Jessy realizes her mistake leading to her transformation and understands Elango. They both patch up and Elango starts going to a job again, thereby starting to lead a humble but joyful life. They sell their posh apartment and settle the bank loan and return to their earlier apartment for rent.

Cast

 Samuthirakani as Elango 
 Ramya Pandian as Jessica aka Jessy
 Kavin as Agaran Muthalvan
 Monica as Aathira
 Radha Ravi as Bullet Thatha
 Ilavarasu as Solvilangum Perumal
 Kaali Venkat as Kaali
 Abhishek Vinod as Roy
 Hareesh Peradi as Samuel
 Suja Varunee as Belita voice given by Devi priya
 Prajin as James
 E. Ramdoss as Travelling Ticket Examiner
 S. S. Stanley as Secretary of Apartment Owners Association
 Anupama Kumar as Lakshmi 
 K. S. G. Venkatesh as Zaitoon Restaurant Owner
 Aranthangi Nisha as Aranthangi Nisha
 Poraali Dileepan as Kumarappa
 Mohan as Police Constable
 Srinika as Selvi
 Nilani as Maami

Production
The film was announced and began production during September 2017, with director Thamira making a comeback to films after previously making Rettaisuzhi (2010). He also announced he would produce the film under the newly launched Sigaram Cinemas, while Samuthirakani and Joker fame Ramya Pandiyan were selected to play the lead roles. Vijay Milton and Ghibran were consequently selected to be the cinematographer and music composer for the project. Aan Devathai was revealed to revolve around the impact of globalisation, marital relationships and the challenges of raising a kid in the modern times.

Soundtrack
The soundtrack was composed by Ghibran.

Release
The film which was initially slated to release in August was released in October 2018. The satellite rights of the film were sold to Zee Tamil.

Critical reception
Times of India wrote "Though this family drama has a tried-and-tested screenplay, with only a few engaging scenes, it is less preachy when compared to some of Samuthirakani’s earlier films." Deccan Chronicle called it "Just an average drama". India Today wrote "Thamira's tries to address the struggles of nuclear families in the fast-paced urban society, but like his one-dimensional characters, the solution he arrives at is also shallow and problematic."

References

External links
 

Indian drama films
2010s Tamil-language films
Films shot in Chennai
Films scored by Mohamaad Ghibran
2018 films